Jawad Akeel Ahannach is a naturalized Qatari football player.

References

External links

1978 births
Living people
Dutch footballers
Association football midfielders
Dutch sportspeople of Moroccan descent
Dutch emigrants to Qatar
Naturalised citizens of Qatar
Qatari footballers
Umm Salal SC players
Al-Gharafa SC players
Qatar Stars League players
Qatari people of Moroccan descent
Sportspeople of Moroccan descent